Xenistius is a genus of grunts native to the eastern Pacific Ocean.

Species
The currently recognized species in this genus are:
 Xenistius californiensis (Steindachner, 1876) (Californian salema)
 Xenistius peruanus Hildebrand, 1946

Systematics
The genus Haemulon was determined to be paraphyletic in molecular studies which showed Haemulon chrysargyreum clustered with Xenistius californianus. The genus Brachygenys which had been created by Felipe Poey in 1868 was revived to include these species and ensure the monophyly of Haemulon. The genus also includes the other species in Xenistius and Xenocys. These changes are recognised by Catalog of Fishes, making Xenistius a synonym of Brachygenys, but not yet by Fishbase.

References

Haemulinae
Taxa named by David Starr Jordan
Taxa named by Charles Henry Gilbert